Prees Heath Common is a nature reserve near Whitchurch in the county of Shropshire, England. Butterfly Conservation owns and manages this reserve. It comprises .

References

External links
 Prees Heath Common Reserve, Shropshire, at the Butterfly Conservation Web site

Butterfly Conservation reserves
Nature reserves in Shropshire